Beluch or the Baloch of Turkmenistan are a small part of the greater  Baloch people who live primarily in Pakistan, Iran and Afghanistan.  They immigrated into the Merv and the Murghab River inland delta from  the areas west and north of Herat, Afghanistan and Iran in the mid 19th century. More followed in the early 20th century and before closure of the Russian/Soviet borders under Stalin in 1925.

The Mervi Beluch are closely related to those Baloch in Afghanistan and Iran who live nearly the modern borders of Turkmenistan. Today they are the only Iranian peoples remaining in the Merv Oasia, after the ancient Persian population of the area was deported on mass to Bukhara and Samarkand by the Manghit emir, Shah Murad in the late 1780s, because they belonged to Shia madhab. Except these Balochs, the entire ancient oasis is now Turkified, with the Turkmens forming a vast majority of the population.

In 1926 the Baluch of Merv Oasis numbered 9,974.  Their numbers fell to 7,842 in the official statistics by 1959 but then rose to 12,582 by 1970 and 18,997 by 1979.

The Baloch of Turkmenistan are Sunni Hanafi Muslims.

See also
 Baloch diaspora
 Baloch people

References

Further reading
Wixman, Ronald.  The Peoples of the USSR: An Ethnographic Handbook. (Armonk, New York: M. E. Sharpe, Inc., 1984) p. 25-26.
MOSHKALO, Vyacheslav V. 2000: "Language and Culture of the Baloch in Turkmenistan". In: Carina JAHANI (ed.): Language in Society – Eight Sociolinguistic Essays on Balochi [Studia Iranica Upsaliensia 3]. Uppsala: Uppsala University, pp. 97–103
Languages of Turkmenistan, Ethnologue.com

Ethnic groups in Turkmenistan
Baloch diaspora
Pakistan–Turkmenistan relations